XHCZ-FM is a radio station on 104.9 FM in San Luis Potosí, San Luis Potosí, Mexico. It is owned by Multimedios Radio, which programs the station with its La Lupe Spanish variety hits format.

History

XECZ-AM began operations in 1934 and received its full concession in 1944. It was owned by Zeferino Zaragoza Jiménez and broadcast on 1430 kHz, soon moving to 960. In 1950 ownership passed to Radiodifusoras Mexicanas, S.A., and in 1999, Radiodifusoras Mexicanas, then owned by GAPE, sold to OEM.

In 2011, XECZ migrated to FM on 104.9 MHz.

On December 1, 2020, Multimedios Radio reached an agreement to purchase XHCZ-FM and immediately took over operations, programming La Lupe on the station.

The transfer to Multimedios Radio was endorsed by the Federal Telecommunications Institute on August 18, 2021. The IFT then approved the relocation of XHCZ from its city center site to the tower also used by Multimedios station XHSNP-FM.

References

Radio stations in San Luis Potosí
Radio stations established in 1934
Multimedios Radio